Copmere End is a small settlement in Staffordshire, England. It is named for the lake, Cop Mere. There is a public house there called the Star Inn.

External links
Copmere End at Streetmap.co.uk

Villages in Staffordshire
Eccleshall